Mount Faber, formerly Telok Blangah Hill, is a hill about  in height, located in the town of Bukit Merah in the Central Region of Singapore. It overlooks the Telok Blangah area, and the western parts of the Central Area. The summit is accessible by Mount Faber Road or Mount Faber Loop via Morse Road, but there are many footpaths or trails leading up the hill. The main paths are: Marang Trail which leads from Marang Road at the Harbourfront MRT station (Exit D) and the Southern Ridges Park Connector which connects from Telok Blangah Hill Park, Kent Ridge Park and Henderson Waves.

It is a major tourist attraction, as it provides a panoramic view of the  dense central business district within the Central Area. Its slope includes a tower that is part of the Singapore cable car system that connects to HarbourFront and Sentosa. It is accessible from the HarbourFront MRT station.

History

Mount Faber was known as Telok Blangah Hill but was later renamed after Captain Charles Edward Faber of the Madras Engineers, the superintending engineer in the Straits and Governor Butterworth's brother-in-law, who arrived in Singapore in September 1844.  Faber cut through the thick undergrowth, allowing the road to the top of the hill to be built. The original winding road was referred to in the press at that time as a "stupidly narrow road".

The article also questioned the change of the name from what it deemed its originally more appropriate Malay name. A signal station was erected on the hill in 1845.  This signal station was transferred from Pulau Blakang Mati (now Sentosa) because of the "injurious miasma" on the island.

After the Indian Mutiny of 1857, the Straits government decided to convert Mount Faber into a fort for fear of revolt among the local Indian sepoys. Defence work was carried out and granite emplacements for guns were completed halfway up the hill, but Mount Faber never became a fort.

Geography
The vegetation around Mount Faber is secondary rainforest that is smaller and less dense than on Bukit Timah Hill. It is separated from the adjacent slightly lower Telok Blangah Hill Park by Henderson Road.

Gallery

See also
List of Parks in Singapore

References
Victor R Savage, Brenda S A Yeoh (2003), Tan Le Ci(2007)Toponymics - A Study of Singapore Street Names, Eastern Universities Press,

External links

National Parks Board, Singapore
 Mount Faber (history), streetdirectory.com Singapore Guide

Hills of Singapore
Bukit Merah